John Mansfield (August 1822May 6, 1896) was an American lawyer, Republican politician, and Union Army officer in the American Civil War.  He commanded the 2nd Wisconsin Infantry Regiment in the famous Iron Brigade and later served as the 15th lieutenant governor of California.

Early life and career
Originally from Monroe County, New York, Mansfield emigrated to Wisconsin prior to the Civil War. During the 1850s, Mansfield practiced law in Portage, Wisconsin.

Civil War service 
Following President Lincoln's call for 75,000 state militia troops in April 1861, at the onset of the Civil War, Mansfield was commissioned as captain of Company G, 2nd Wisconsin Infantry Regiment, known as the "Portage Guards." Mustered at Camp Randall in Madison on June 11, 1861, Mansfield's regiment entered as a three-year regiment and departed Wisconsin for Washington, D.C. on June 20 to join the Army of the Potomac. At Washington, Mansfield's regiment was initially brigaded under William T. Sherman along with the 13th New York Volunteer Infantry, the 69th New York Volunteer Infantry and the 79th New York Volunteer Infantry.

Mansfield's regiment first saw action at the First Battle of Bull Run in July 1861. Mansfield and the 2nd Wisconsin went on to take part in many key battles of the war as part of the famed Iron Brigade, including South Mountain, Antietam, and Gettysburg.

Battle of Gettysburg 
At Gettysburg, Mansfield had become major of the 2nd Wisconsin and was the 2nd highest ranking officer left in the regiment.  The 2nd Wisconsin and the Iron Brigade were part of the 1st Division of I Corps, under Brig. General James S. Wadsworth, and were at the vanguard on the march to Gettysburg.

On the first day of fighting, July 1, 1863, the 2nd Wisconsin engaged a Confederate brigade under Brig. General James J. Archer at McPherson Woods.  Early in the fighting, 2nd Wisconsin soldier Private Patrick Maloney captured Archer himself, who surrendered his sword to Mansfield.  Archer's surrender to Mansfield marked the first capture of a Confederate general officer since Robert E. Lee had assumed command of the Army of Northern Virginia.

Later in the first day of fighting, Major Mansfield assumed command of the 2nd Wisconsin after the senior officer, future Wisconsin governor Lucius Fairchild, was shot. Mansfield himself would be wounded later that same day and be forced to relinquish command of the regiment. Following the battle, Mansfield was appointed lieutenant colonel on July 5, 1863 and went on to serve in the Bristoe and Mine Run Campaigns before being wounded and captured in June 1864 during the Overland Campaign. Held at Libby Prison in Richmond, Mansfield was later returned to the north as part of a prisoner exchange.

Towards the end of the Civil War, Mansfield became colonel of the Veteran Reserve Corps, a reserve organization also known as the U.S. Invalid Corps, made up of men unfit for combat but able to assist in hospital work or other light duties. Mansfield was later brevetted as a brigadier general of volunteers, a rank to date from March 13, 1865.

Lieutenant Governor 
Following the war, Mansfield settled in California and later served as a delegate to the second California constitutional convention in 1878 and 1879 and as an at-large delegate to the 1880 Republican National Convention. He was elected as California's lieutenant governor in 1879 and served one term under Republican Governor George C. Perkins from 1880 to 1883.

Mansfield died at his home in Los Angeles in 1896 and was cremated. His ashes were interred in Angelus-Rosedale Cemetery without record of their location.

Mansfield may be the namesake of Mansfield, Illinois, although other sources suggest the village was named after other unrelated men named Mansfield, or potentially the city of Mansfield, Ohio.

References

Further reading

External links
 

|-

|-

Lieutenant Governors of California
Union Army colonels
American Civil War prisoners of war
1822 births
1896 deaths
California Republicans
Iron Brigade
People of Wisconsin in the American Civil War
Politicians from Los Angeles
Burials at Angelus-Rosedale Cemetery
19th-century American politicians
Military personnel from California